The Cork-Waterford rivalry is a Gaelic football rivalry between Irish county teams Cork and Waterford, who first played each other in 1890. It is a rivalry that has been dominated by Cork. Cork's home ground is Páirc Uí Chaoimh and Waterford's home ground is the Walsh Park.

While Cork have 37 Munster titles, Waterford are regarded as provincial minnows and have won just one provincial title.

All time results

Championship

References

Waterford
Waterford county football team rivalries